KECA refers to the following broadcasting stations in the United States:

KABC (AM), a radio station on 790 kHz licensed to Los Angeles, California, United States, which held the call sign KECA from 1929 to 1954
KLOS, an FM radio station on 95.5 MHz licensed to Los Angeles, California, United States, which held the call sign KECA-FM from 1947 to 1954
KABC-TV, a television station on channel 7 licensed to Los Angeles, California, United States, which held the call sign KECA-TV from 1949 to 1954
KWLF, an FM radio station on 98.1 MHz licensed to Fairbanks, Alaska, United States, which held the call sign KECA from 1985 to 1986
KKHB, an FM radio station on 105.5 MHz licensed to Eureka, California, United States, which held the call sign KECA from 1988 to 1993
KECA-LD, a low-power television station on channel 29 licensed to Eureka, California, United States
 A fictional radio station in Breaking Bad broadcasting at 480 kHz.